Travis Marquez “Bonesaw” Outlaw (born September 18, 1984) is an American former professional basketball player.

High school career
Outlaw attended Starkville High School, where he played for the Starkville Yellowjackets high school basketball team. Considered a five-star recruit by Rivals.com, he was listed as the No. 7 small forward and the No. 13 player in the nation in 2003.

NBA career

Portland Trail Blazers (2003–2010)
Entering the 2003 NBA Draft directly out of high school, Outlaw was a first-round selection (23rd overall) by the Portland Trail Blazers. He averaged 8.6 points on 44.2% field goal shooting and 3.2 rebounds per game during his first five years in the NBA.

In the 2005 NBA Summer League, Outlaw averaged 18.7 points and 6.3 rebounds in 35.5 minutes. The performance earned him First Team All-RVSL honors.  Following the NBA summer league, several teams offered to trade for Outlaw in exchange for a first-round draft pick.  Former Portland Trail Blazers director of player personnel Kevin Pritchard said that Travis "... [is] going to be with us for a long time. I feel comfortable enough to say he's going to be a special player."

On April 18, 2007, Outlaw set a new career-high with 36 points against the Golden State Warriors. He became a restricted free agent on July 1, 2007, and signed a three-year contract extension on July 17.

Los Angeles Clippers (2010)
In February 2010, the Trail Blazers traded Outlaw, Steve Blake and $1.5 million in cash to the Los Angeles Clippers for Marcus Camby.

New Jersey Nets (2010–2011)
On July 8, 2010, Outlaw signed a 5-year deal worth $35 million with the New Jersey Nets.

On December 15, 2011, the New Jersey Nets waived Outlaw under the amnesty provision.

Sacramento Kings (2011–2014)
On December 17, 2011, Outlaw was claimed by the Sacramento Kings off waivers.

Outlaw's final NBA game ended up being during his tenure with Sacramento, as his final game was on April 16, 2014 in a 99 - 104 loss to the Phoenix Suns. Outlaw played for 24 and a half minutes off the bench and recorded 15 points, 5 rebounds and 2 assists.

New York Knicks (2014)
On August 6, 2014, Outlaw was traded, along with Quincy Acy, to the New York Knicks in exchange for Wayne Ellington and Jeremy Tyler. On October 27, 2014, Outlaw was traded, along with a 2019 second-round draft selection and the option exchange 2018 second-round draft selections, to the Philadelphia 76ers in exchange for Arnett Moultrie. He was waived by the 76ers later that day.

Personal life 
On August 14, 2016, Outlaw was arrested and charged with felony marijuana possession in his hometown of Starkville, Mississippi. On May 5, 2017, Outlaw pleaded guilty to felony marijuana possession and was sentenced to serve two years of non-adjudicated probation.

NBA career statistics

Regular season 

|-
| align="left" | 
| align="left" | Portland
| 8 || 0 || 2.4 || .429 || .000 || .500 || .5 || .1 || .1 || .0 || 1.0
|-
| align="left" | 
| align="left" | Portland
| 59 || 2 || 13.4 || .498 || .400 || .653 || 2.1 || .6 || .5 || .7 || 5.4
|-
| align="left" | 
| align="left" | Portland
| 69 || 11 || 16.7 || .440 || .264 || .697 || 2.7 || .5 || .4 || .7 || 5.8
|-
| align="left" | 
| align="left" | Portland
| 67 || 1 || 22.9 || .434 || .270 || .790 || 3.2 || .8 || .9 || 1.1 || 5.9
|-
| align="left" | 
| align="left" | Portland
| 82 || 6 || 26.7 || .433 || .396 || .741 || 4.6 || 1.3 || .7 || .8 || 13.3
|-
| align="left" | 
| align="left" | Portland
| 81 || 6 || 27.7 || .453 || .377 || .723 || 4.1 || 1.0 || .6 || .7 || 12.8
|-
| align="left" | 
| align="left" | Portland
| 11 || 0 || 21.0 || .376 || .387 || .875 || 3.5 || .7 || .6 || .7 || 9.9
|-
| align="left" | 
| align="left" | L.A. Clippers
| 23 || 6 || 21.7 || .400 || .378 || .800 || 3.6 || 1.1 || .5 || .4 || 4.5
|-
| align="left" | 
| align="left" | New Jersey
| 82 || 55 || 28.8 || .375 || .302 || .772 || 4.0 || 1.0 || .4 || .4 || 6.3
|-
| align="left" | 
| align="left" | Sacramento
| 39 || 5 || 12.8 || .343 || .267 || .674 || 1.6 || .4 || .5 || .5 || 4.3
|-
| align="left" | 
| align="left" | Sacramento
| 38 || 2 || 11.7 || .418 || .280 || .731 || 1.6 || .6 || .3 || .2 || 5.3
|-
| align="left" | 
| align="left" | Sacramento
| 63 || 4 || 16.9 || .399 || .350 || .808 || 2.7 || .8 || .3 || .3 || 5.4
|- class="sortbottom"
| style="text-align:center;" colspan="2"| Career
| 622 || 98 || 20.9 || .423 || .337 || .744 || 3.2 || .8 || .5 || .6 || 8.5

Playoffs 

|-
| align="left" | 2009
| align="left" | Portland
| 6 || 0 || 28.3 || .318 || .250 || .667 || 3.0 || .5 || .8 || .7 || 9.0
|- class="sortbottom"
| style="text-align:center;" colspan="2"| Career
| 6 || 0 || 28.3 || .318 || .250 || .667 || 3.0 || .5 || .8 || .7 || 9.0

References

External links 
NBA.com profile
ESPN.com profile

1984 births
Living people
African-American basketball players
American men's basketball players
Basketball players from Mississippi
Los Angeles Clippers players
McDonald's High School All-Americans
National Basketball Association high school draftees
New Jersey Nets players
Parade High School All-Americans (boys' basketball)
Portland Trail Blazers draft picks
Portland Trail Blazers players
Sacramento Kings players
Small forwards
Sportspeople from Starkville, Mississippi
Starkville High School alumni
21st-century African-American sportspeople
20th-century African-American people